Longwood station is a train station in Longwood, Florida, served by SunRail, the commuter train of Central Florida. The station opened May 1, 2014, and marks a return of passenger rail service in Longwood dating back to the community's days as a junction of the South Florida Railroad, Orange Belt Railway and old Florida Midland Railway, all of which were acquired by the Atlantic Coast Line Railroad.

Unlike most SunRail stations, which feature canopies consisting of white aluminum poles supporting sloped green roofs, Longwood's canopies have traditional brown gabled roofs with cupolas and faux dormer windows. It also includes ticket vending machines, ticket validators, emergency call boxes, drinking fountains, separate platforms designed for passengers in wheelchairs. The station is located along the former CSX A-Line (originally constructed by the South Florida Railroad) northeast of the Longwood Historic District on the north side of East Church Avenue. A transit-oriented development called Weston Park was built adjacent to the station, which features a 208-unit, four story luxury apartment community.

References

External links

Longwood Station (SunRail)
Atlantic Coast Line Railroad Stations - Jacksonville to Sarasota, including Longwood (Robert Mortell's Road and Rail Pictures)

SunRail stations
Railway stations in the United States opened in 2014
Transportation buildings and structures in Seminole County, Florida
2014 establishments in Florida
Longwood, Florida